Oscar George "Dutch" Hendrian (January 19, 1896 – December 13, 1953) was an American actor and former American football player in the National Football League.

Career

Football
Hendrian first played college football at the University of Pittsburgh where he played on the school's freshman football team in 1919. He also played on the school's freshman baseball team and performed in the university's student theatrical Cap and Gown Club in the spring of 1920. Hendrian then transferred to Princeton University where he finished out his college football career.  He started his professional career as a running back in the NFL with the Akron Pros in 1923.  He then played for the Canton Bulldogs, the Green Bay Packers, the New York Giants, and the Rock Island Independents.

Acting
He made his debut in the movie The Happy Hottentots, playing Rosco.  Many of his roles were uncredited, and he rarely had lines, usually playing extras.  His two most notable movies were Son of Kong and The Most Dangerous Game.  He retired from acting after his last movie, Belle of the Yukon, playing a miner.  He died in Los Angeles, California on December 13, 1953.

References

External links

1896 births
1953 deaths
Coaches of American football from Michigan
Male actors from Detroit
20th-century American male actors
American male film actors
American football running backs
Princeton Tigers football players
Pittsburgh Panthers football players
Pittsburgh Panthers baseball players
Akron Pros players
Akron Pros coaches
Canton Bulldogs players
Green Bay Packers players
New York Giants players
Rock Island Independents players
Players of American football from Detroit